John Kakooza (born 12 December 1964) is a Ugandan boxer. He competed in the men's flyweight event at the 1984 Summer Olympics.

References

1964 births
Living people
Ugandan male boxers
Olympic boxers of Uganda
Boxers at the 1984 Summer Olympics
Place of birth missing (living people)
Flyweight boxers